"Rock City" is a song by American rapper Royce da 5'9", released as the third single from his debut album, Rock City (Version 2.0), which was released in 2002 through E1 Music (formerly "Koch Records") and Game Recordings, after another record label had turned down his first version of the album. The song also features vocals from rapper Eminem, becoming Eminem's debut appearance on one of Royce's solo albums. The single was released on January 5, 2002, the same date as its same titled album was released. "Rock City" charted at #99 on the Hot R&B/Hip-Hop Singles & Tracks chart in 2002. Not counting Bad Meets Evil or Slaughterhouse songs, "Rock City" is Royce da 5'9"'s most successful single chart-wise.

Critical response
Bradley Torreano highlighted the song and wrote: "The rollicking hometown anthem "Rock City" includes Eminem on the snappy chorus, but the verses are pure Royce as he waxes philosophical his role in the Motor City scene." Afrikka of DX magazine was also positive: "Rock City" the first single off this album is just a straight banger. Featuring Eminem on the chorus, this beat will have you nodding. However, I must say that the remix that is present on this album is not as good. Because this is an Enhanced CD, you are privy to the original "Rock City" video and song; that's where it's at." Rap Reviews was lukewarm: "As the ticking and menacing Primo beat banged out Royce's street-smart punchlines coast to coast, the first version of "Rock City" was heavily anticipated by hungry rap head (...) Despite a brief push for the title track (wisely featuring Eminem) as the second single, "Rock City" was put on the shelf and both rapper and album went back for fine tuning." Vibe magazine called this song "hometown anthem."

Music video
Rock City music video was premiered on January 28, 2002. The music video for "Rock City" starts off with a view of a woman's house, she decides to put on a Royce da 5'9" record and have a peaceful cup of tea. She then almost spills her tea after the television turns on along with the noisy record starting, there is a news report called "Eyewitnessing News" and the reporter reports about so many people rushing to a hip hop performance where both Royce and Eminem are playing the song. The rest of the music video just shows Royce da 5'9" either driving around in his convertible car or at the performance place when he is rapping his verses. Eminem sings the chorus and only appears in the live performance scenes of the video. American rapper Proof from the rap group D12, which is Eminem's group, can be seen near the end of the video.

Track listing

Chart positions
"'Rock City'" charted at #99 on the "US Billboard Hot R&B/Hip-Hop Singles & Tracks Charts", #45 on the "Belgium Charts", #30 on the "Germany Charts", #44 on the "Sweden Charts" and #37 on the "Switzerland Charts" respectively.

References

External links

2002 singles
Royce da 5'9" songs
Eminem songs
Songs written by Eminem
Songs written by Royce da 5'9"
MNRK Music Group singles